Inch High, Private Eye is a short-lived American animated television series produced by Hanna-Barbera Productions and broadcast on NBC from September 8, to December 1, 1973.  

The character was modeled after Maxwell Smart, the main character of the 1965-1970 comedy Get Smart, and Lennie Weinrib's performance as Inch High is an imitation of Don Adams' character.

Plot
The titular character of Inch High Private Eye is a miniature detective (literally one inch high), who attained his diminutive stature by way of a secret shrinking potion. Inch often enlists the help of his niece Lori (sometimes written "Laurie"), her muscle-bound sweetheart Gator, and their dog Braveheart to help solve mysteries. Their primary mode of transportation is the Hushmobile, a streamlined car that makes virtually no noise while being driven, making it perfect for following criminals unnoticed.

Inch works for The Finkerton Detective Agency (a wordplay lampoon of The Pinkerton Detective Agency), where the boss Mr. Finkerton constantly dreams of the day that he will fire him.

Unlike most Hanna-Barbera mystery solving cartoons, which feature teen sleuths, the characters in this show are all adults.

Voice cast
 Leonard Weinrib - Inch High
 Kathy Gori - Lori
 Bob Luttrell - Gator
 Don Messick - Braveheart
 John Stephenson - Mr. Finkerton
 Jean Vander Pyl - Mrs. Finkerton

Additional voices
 Jamie Farr  
 Ted Knight  
 Alan Oppenheimer  
 Vic Perrin  
 Janet Waldo

Episodes

Other appearances
 Inch High appears in a Cartoon Network commercial, where he teams up with Batman to fight crime, only to be crushed when running to the Batmobile.
 Inch High was also featured in an episode of Harvey Birdman, Attorney at Law, in which he sues his Mr. Finkerton for wrongful dismissal as Mr. Finkerton claims that he is too short to be a P.I. Inch was voiced by Maurice LaMarche while Mr. Finkerton was voiced by Chris Edgerly.
 Inch High appears in Jellystone! voiced by Fajer Al-Kaisi. In the episode "It's a Mad, Mad, Mad Rat Rat Race", Inch High was a patron of Morocco Mole's sauna-themed restaurant "Saunas, Sweat & Sandwiches" where he demanded that Lippy the Lion and Hardy Har Har turn down their only comedy album which he insulted as being bad. They throw him in their chest with the comedy album where they misplaced the chest when Morocco Mole called the police on them for causing a disturbance. When the chest is opened later upon being found by Yogi Bear, Boo Boo Bear, Cindy Bear, Jabberjaw, Loopy De Loop, Augie Doggie, Shag Rugg, and Yakky Doodle, Inch High was found in the chest as Lippy and Hardy recall about the events. After Inch High asks for someone to call his family, Hardy Har Har shuts the chest on him. In "The Box Thief", Inch High was seen in the unboxing videos of Jabberjaw and Mayor Huckleberry Hound. When it comes to the latter's video, he put Inch High back in the box.
 Inch High makes a voice-only cameo in the Velma episode "Velma Makes a List".

Home media
On April 24, 2012, Warner Archive released Inch High Private Eye: The Complete Series on DVD in region 1 as part of their Hanna–Barbera Classics Collection. This is a Manufacture-on-Demand (MOD) release, available exclusively through Warner's online store and Amazon.com.

References

External links
 
 Inch High, Private Eye at Don Markstein's Toonopedia. Archived from the original on September 1, 2016.
 Inch High, Private Eye at Thrillingdetective

1970s American animated television series
NBC original programming
1973 American television series debuts
1973 American television series endings
Television series by Hanna-Barbera
Hanna-Barbera characters
American children's animated adventure television series
American children's animated comedy television series
American children's animated mystery television series
American detective television series
English-language television shows